Culpin is a surname, and may refer to:

 Ewart Culpin (1877–1946), British politician and town planner
 Jack Culpin (born 1927), Australian politician
 Millais Culpin (1874–1952), British psychologist
 Millice Culpin (1846–1941), Australian politician
 Paul Culpin (born 1962), English footballer